"House of Love" is a song by Australian duo Vika and Linda. It was released as the second single from her debut studio album Vika and Linda (1994). It peaked at number 98 in Australia and 32 in New Zealand.

Track listings
CD/Cassette single (D11690)
 "House of Love" – 4:12
 "99 Years" – 3:56

Charts

References

1994 songs
1994 singles
Mushroom Records singles
Songs written by Paul Kelly (Australian musician)